The Zeitschrift für Papyrologie und Epigraphik (commonly abbreviated ZPE; "Journal of Papyrology and Epigraphy") is a peer-reviewed academic journal which contains articles that pertain to papyrology and epigraphy. It has been described as "the world's leading and certainly most prolific journal of papyrology." ZPE, established by Reinhold Merkelbech and Ludwig Koenen in 1967, is published four to five times annually by Rudolf Habelt GmbH. It is renowned for its ability to publish new articles very quickly.

References

External links 

Archive at JSTOR

Classics journals
Publications established in 1967
Multilingual journals
Papyrology